Qaleh Hasan (also Romanized as Qal‘eh Ḩasan; also known as Kalāteh Ḩasan) is a village in Firuzeh Rural District, in the Central District of Firuzeh County, Razavi Khorasan Province, Iran. At the 2006 census, its population was 61, in 16 families.

References 

Populated places in Firuzeh County